Filisur railway station is a railway station in the municipality of Filisur, in the Swiss canton of Graubünden. It is located at the junction of the  Albula and Davos Platz–Filisur lines of the Rhaetian Railway. Hourly services operate on both lines.

There are currently three platforms in use at Filisur station. From the direction of Chur, the line passes through Thusis and Tiefencastel. It then crosses two of the Rhaetian Railway's major railway bridges before arriving in Filisur: the Schmittentobel Viaduct, and the Landwasser Viaduct. On the Davos to Filisur line, trains from Davos similarly cross the Wiesen Viaduct just before entering Filisur.

Services
The following services stop at Filisur:

 Glacier Express: Several round-trips per day between Zermatt and St. Moritz.
 InterRegio: hourly service between Chur and St. Moritz.
 Regio:
 limited service between Chur and St. Moritz.

Gallery of nearby bridges

References

External links
 
 
 Webcam overlooking the Filisur station platforms 

Railway stations in Switzerland opened in 1903
Railway stations in Graubünden
Rhaetian Railway stations